Stefan Andersson may refer to:

 Stefan Andersson (speedway rider) (born 1971), former Swedish speedway rider
 Stefan Andersson (singer) (born 1967), Swedish singer and songwriter
 Stefan Andersson (bandy) (born 1969), Swedish bandy player

See also
 Stefan Anderson (1878–1966), Swedish industrialist, journalist and master craftsman watchmaker